At Twelve: Portraits of Young Women is a 1988 photography book by Sally Mann. The book is published by Aperture and contains 37 duotone images of 12-year-old girls. The girls are the children of friends and relatives of Mann in her home state Virginia. Unlike Mann's later work, the images within the book do not feature nudity. The book is dedicated to Mann's husband, Larry.

Reception
The Museum of Contemporary Photography stated the book "capture[s] the confusing emotions and developing identities of adolescent girls," particularly praising an image entitled 'Candy Cigarette'.

Andy Grundberg from The New York Times gave a favourable review, stating "Ms. Mann is at her best when she concentrates on flesh and blood. Her picture of a girl in a tank top, taken over the subject's shoulder from behind so that all we see is the curve of her shoulder melding with the shape of her breast, shows how powerful simplicity can be."

The subject of the images within the book created a minor controversy; however, Mann's work was only protested following the release of her next book, Immediate Family.

References

External links
Official profile at the publishers website

1988 non-fiction books
Books by Sally Mann
American non-fiction books